Bestwick is a surname. Notable people with the surname include:

Allen Bestwick (born 1961), American sportscaster currently working for ESPN
Billy Bestwick (1875–1938), English cricketer
Deborah Bestwick MBE (born 1970), British entrepreneur
Dick Bestwick (1930–2018), American football coach
Harold Bestwick, English footballer
Jamie Bestwick (born 1971), British BMX rider
Robert Bestwick (1899–1980), English cricketer
Simon Bestwick (born 1974), English writer
Wilbur Bestwick, the first Sergeant Major of the Marine Corps

See also
Beswick (disambiguation)
Bewick (disambiguation)
Estwick